Trichoscypha is a genus of plants in the family Anacardiaceae.

Species include:

 Trichoscypha acuminata Engl.
 Trichoscypha bijuga Engl.
 Trichoscypha cavalliensis Aubrev. & Pellegr.
 Trichoscypha mannii Hook.f.
 Trichoscypha oddonii De Wild.

 
Anacardiaceae genera
Taxonomy articles created by Polbot